Glenwood Township is an inactive township in Schuyler County, in the U.S. state of Missouri.

Glenwood Township was erected in 1858.

References

Townships in Missouri
Townships in Schuyler County, Missouri
1858 establishments in Missouri